Mohammed bin Khalid Al Saud (born 1967) is a member of House of Saud and a businessman. He is the president and director of Al Faisaliah Group. He has been the chairman of the board of directors of the Saudi Telecom Company since 2018.

Early life and education
Mohammed bin Khalid was born in 1967. He is a grandson of Abdullah bin Faisal and therefore, a great grandson of King Faisal. Mohammed's father was Khalid bin Abdullah. His mother is a daughter of King Khalid, Al Jawhara.

Mohammed bin Khalid is a graduate of King Fahd University of Petroleum and Minerals and received a bachelor's degree in industrial management. He received an MBA from Harvard Business School in 1996.

Career
Mohammed bin Khalid started his career at Citibank in New York and Geneva. Next he served as the assistant general manager of the Saudi American Bank for seven months. Then in May 1997 he began to work as vice president at Al Faisaliah Group on the request of his uncle, Mohammed bin Abdullah who was then chairman of the company. The company was founded by Mohammed's grandfather Abdullah bin Faisal in 1970. Mohammed bin Khalid has been the president and director of the company since 2002.

Mohammed bin Khalid was appointed chairman of the Saudi Telecom Company in 2018.

Other positions and activities
Mohammed bin Khalid has been serving as a member in distinct organizations: Harvard Alumni Association in Saudi Arabia, King Faisal Foundation, Saudi Arabian National Competitiveness Center, JP Morgan Saudi Arabia and the King Salman Center for Disability Research. As of 2015 he was the JP Morgan Saudi Arabia's chairman of the board of directors.

As of March 2022 Mohammed bin Khalid was among the financiers of the Saudi Media Group which had plans to acquire the English football club Chelsea F.C.

References

Mohammed
Mohammed
1967 births
Mohammed
Mohammed
Mohammed
Living people
Mohammed